is a common masculine Japanese given name. It can also be transliterated as Hirosi.

Possible writings
Hiroshi can be written using different kanji characters and can mean:

浩, "meaning"
弘, 
宏, 
寛, 
洋,
博,
大,
広志,
博司,
博史,

People with the name
, Japanese comedian
Hiroshi Abe (disambiguation), multiple people
, Japanese actor
, Japanese astronomer
Hiroshi Abe (war criminal) (born 1922), Japanese soldier
, Japanese screenwriter and film director
, Japanese baseball player
, Japanese actor
, Japanese handball player
Hiroshi Hara (disambiguation), multiple people
Hiroshi Hashimoto (disambiguation), multiple people
Hiroshi Honda (disambiguation), multiple people
, Japanese ice hockey player
, Japanese footballer
, Japanese bobsledder
, Japanese film director
, Japanese footballer
, Japanese diplomat
, Japanese electrical engineer
, Japanese lepidopterist
, Japanese bryologist
, Japanese ski jumper
Hiroshi Ito (disambiguation), multiple people
, Japanese enka singer
, Japanese golfer
, Japanese professional baseball player
Hiroshi Kajiyama (disambiguation), multiple people
, Japanese voice actor
, Japanese shogi player
Hiroshi Kashiwagi (1922–2019), American poet, playwright and actor
, Japanese footballer and manager
, Japanese aikidoka
, Japanese actor
, Japanese actor
, Japanese video game composer
, Japanese boxer
, Japanese businessman
, Japanese singer
, Japanese shogi player
Hiroshi Kobayashi (shogi, born 1976), Japanese shogi player
, Japanese announcer and television presenter
Hiroshi Lockheimer, a Japanese German software engineer and one of the founding members of the Android team at Google
, Japanese freestyle skier
Hiroshi Masuoka (disambiguation), multiple people
Hiroshi Matsumoto (disambiguation), multiple people
, Japanese gymnast
, Japanese ice hockey player
, Japanese actor
, President and CEO of Rakuten
, Japanese politician
, Japanese swimmer
, Japanese shogi player
, Japanese actor
Hiroshi H. Miyamura (1925–2022), United States Army soldier and Medal of Honor recipient
Hiroshi Mori (disambiguation), multiple people
, better known as Heath, Japanese musician
, Japanese footballer
, Japanese jazz drummer
 Japanese singer, a member of boy band V6
 Hiroshi Naganuma, Japanese shogi player
, Japanese boxer
, Mayor of Yokohama City, Kanagawa Prefecture, Japan
, Japanese football player
, Japanese baseball player
, Japanese comedian
, Japanese director
, Japanese former baseball player and convicted murderer
, Japanese shogi player
, Japanese theoretical physicist
, Japanese screenwriter and novelist
Hiroshi Ōshima, Japanese general and diplomat
, Japanese voice actor
, Japanese basketball player
, Japanese diplomat
, Japanese footballer
, Japanese politician from Yamagata, Yamagata Prefecture
, Japanese mathematician
, Japanese politician from Tokorozawa, Saitama Prefecture
, Japanese modern pentathlete
, Japanese rower
, Japanese swimmer
, Japanese director of several anime and manga series
, Japanese footballer
, Japanese curler and curling coach
, Japanese screenwriter
, Japanese table tennis player
, Japanese voice actor
, Japanese voice actor
, pen name of  Kaoru Kishiue, Japanese writer
Hiroshi Shimizu (disambiguation), multiple people
Hiroshi Suzuki (disambiguation), multiple people
, Japanese actor
, Japanese architect
, Japanese manga artist
, Japanese table tennis player
, Japanese voice actor
Hiroshi Takeya, a professor and physician in Japan
, Japanese television presenter
, Japanese actor
Hiroshi Tanahashi (棚橋弘至, born 1976), Japanese professional wrestler
, Japanese figure skater and coach
, Japanese high jumper
, Japanese filmmaker
, Japanese rower
, Japanese actor
, Japanese archaeologist and anthropologist
, former Yokozuna in sumo
Hiroshi Watanabe (disambiguation), multiple people
, Japanese politician
, samurai, politician and educator
, Japanese archer
, Japanese politician
Hiroshi Yamamoto (shogi), Japanese shogi player
, Japanese naval officer
, Japanese cyclist
, Japanese professional wrestler
, former president of Nintendo
, Japanese photographer
, Japanese weightlifter
, Japanese economist
, Japanese musician and composer
, Japanese author (of books such as Math Girls) and computer programmer

People with the surname 
 Sandro Hiroshi, Japanese-Brazilian footballer

Fictional characters 
Hiroshi (Gaeru), the protagonist of Dokonjō Gaeru
Hiroshi (Pokémon), known in English as Ritchie, a character in the Pokémon anime
Hiroshi (Ranma), a character in Ranma ½, one of Ranma's two friends, the other being Daisuke
Hiroshi (Sesame Street), an aspiring artist on Sesame Street played by Gedde Watanabe in the late 1980s/Early 1990s
Hiroshi Abe, a character in Shonan Junai Gumi
Hiroshi Agasa (Herschel Agasa in the English anime), in Case Closed: Detective Conan
Hiroshi Akiba, a character from the manga Inubaka
Hiroshi Ichikawa, a character from Wild Strikers
Hiroshi Ichikawa, a character in the Manga and anime Kaibutsu-kun
Hiroshi Kochatani, a character in Great Teacher Onizuka
Hiroshi Kubo, a character from the novel Shiosai
Hiroshi Kuronaga, Boy #9 in Battle Royale
Hiroshi Matsumoto, a character in Miss Machiko
Hiroshi Morenos, a character from the anime Michiko & Hatchin
Hiroshi Mochizuki, a character in Kamen Rider ZO
Hiroshi Nakano, a character in the Manga and anime Gravitation
Hiroshi Nitta, a character in Denjin Zaborger
Hiroshi Nohara (born c. 1960), father of the protagonist, Shinnosuke, in Crayon Shin-chan
Hiroshi Sakura, the father of the protagonist, Momoko Maruko, in Chibi Maruko-chan
Hiroshi Uchiyamada, a character in Great Teacher Onizuka
Hiroshi Udagawa, a fictional businessman in the Australian soap opera Neighbours
Hiroshi Yushima, a character in Digimon Savers
Hiroshi Sato, Superior businessman, Equalist sympathizer, and father to Asami Sato in The Legend of Korra
Hiroshi, the main protagonist of the survival horror game Ao Oni
Hiroshi, the main protagonist of the Durarara!
Hiroshi Hirai, a character in Denshi Sentai Denziman
Hiroshi Fukuda, a character in Kuroko no Basuke
Hiroshi Fumihiro, from Initial D
Hiroshi Hayashi, a character in Yakuza

Japanese masculine given names